Blue Lake is a lake in Hubbard County, in the U.S. state of Minnesota.

Blue Lake was so named on account of the blueish tint of its waters.

See also
List of lakes in Minnesota

References

Lakes of Minnesota
Lakes of Hubbard County, Minnesota